Kent Town is an inner suburb of Adelaide, South Australia. It is located in the City of Norwood Payneham & St Peters.

History

Kent Town was named for Dr. Benjamin Archer Kent (1808 – 25 November 1864), a medical practitioner of Walsall, Staffordshire, who emigrated to South Australia aboard Warrior, arriving in April 1840 with his wife Marjory Redman Kent, née Bonnar, and two children, Benjamin Andrew Kent, and Graham Eliza Kent, who in 1848 married Dr Frederick Charles Bayer (died 15 August 1867). Hydraulic engineer C. A. Bayer and architect E. H. Bayer were sons. Another son, Tom, was a kangaroo hunter, who went to live at the township of Yalata (now Fowlers Bay) on the west coast, and created a cluster of cottages named "Kent Town", which no longer exist.

Kent established a flour mill and farm which failed financially and he was obliged to return to his profession to support his family. He sold his property at a handsome profit, repaid all his creditors and returned to England.

He was the attendant physician when Edwin Thomas Smith was born. Smith later built his Kent Town Brewery on the site of the doctor's cottage.

Kent Town was the location of two successive sites of the Kent Town Brewery the second of which in 1888 became the malthouse for SA Brewing, now redeveloped into apartments.

Demographics of Kent Town

The 2016 Census by the Australian Bureau of Statistics measured the population of Kent Town at 1,210 persons. Of these, 57% were male and 43% were female.

The 2016 Census by the Australian Bureau of Statistics recorded 227 families living in the suburb. Of those families, there was an average of 1.6 children for families with children and an average of 0.3 for all families.

The majority of residents (62.3%) are of Australian birth, with other common census responses being Malaysia (3.8%), India (3.7%), China (3.7%) and England (3.6%).

The age distribution of Kent Town residents is comparable to that of the greater Australian population. 66.2% of residents were over 25 years in 2006, compared to the Australian average of 66.5%; and 33.8% were younger than 25 years, compared to the Australian average of 33.5%.

Community

Schools
Prince Alfred College, an independent school for boys is located on Dequetteville Terrace, the western boundary of the suburb.

Attractions
During the Adelaide Fringe festival, the world's second-largest annual arts festival, the bars and restaurants of Kent Town receive thousands of customers.

The local Kent Town Hotel boasts craft beer in a stylish pub with a jungle-themed BBQ restaurant and a rooftop bar with a dunk tank.

One attraction in Kent Town is the Wesley Uniting Church. Founded as the Jubilee Wesleyan Methodist church in 1864 by George P. Harris, John Colton, F. H. Faulding and others, Wesley Uniting Church has had a significant place in the life of South Australians for over 150 years.

Transport

Roads
The suburb is serviced by the following main roads:
Dequetteville Terrace, forming the western boundary of the suburb.
Fullarton Road, running north–south between Norwood and Springfield
Rundle Street, cutting horizontally across the middle of Kent Town.

Public transport
Kent Town is serviced by buses run by the Adelaide Metro. Earlier a tram serviced Kent Town and other eastern suburbs.

See also
List of Adelaide suburbs

References

External links
City of Norwood Payneham & St Peters
Local Government Association of SA - City of Norwood Payneham & St Peters
2006 ABS Census Data by Location

Suburbs of Adelaide